Smiggers Island is an island lying 1 nautical mile (1.9 km) southeast of Weller Island, Pitt Islands, in the Biscoe Islands. Photographed by Hunting Aerosurveys Ltd. in 1956, and mapped from these photos by the Falkland Islands Dependencies Survey (FIDS). Named by the United Kingdom Antarctic Place-Names Committee (UK-APC) in 1959 after Joseph Smiggers, Esquire, Perpetual Vice President of the Pickwick Club in Charles Dickens' Pickwick Papers.

See also 
 List of Antarctic and sub-Antarctic islands

Islands of the Biscoe Islands